Sensible Software was a British software company founded by Jon Hare and Chris Yates that was active from March 1986 to June 1999. It released seven number-one hit games and won numerous industry awards.

The company used exaggeratedly small sprites as the player characters in many of their games, including Mega Lo Mania, Sensible Soccer, Cannon Fodder, and Sensible Golf.

History

8-bit era
Sensible Software was formed in Chelmsford, Essex in 1986 by two former school friends, Jon Hare (nicknamed Jovial Jops) and Chris Yates (nicknamed Cuddly Krix). They worked for 9 months at LT Software in Basildon, and started Sensible Software in March 1986.

Sensible initially released games for the ZX Spectrum and later the Commodore 64, clinching market praise with Parallax, Shoot'Em-Up Construction Kit, and Wizball (later to be voted Game of the Decade by Zzap!64 magazine). At the time, the pair's output was well known among gamers for its high quality and offbeat sense of humour.

In 1988 Martin Galway joined the team, making it a three-way partnership. In mid-1988, it released Microprose Soccer, its first venture into association football games.

By 1993 there were 6 staff members.

16-bit era
Galway left in 1990 to join Origin Systems in the US, and over the next few years the company swapped the 8 bit machines for the more powerful 16-bit Amiga and Atari ST systems, where games such as Wizkid: The Story of Wizball II, Mega-Lo-Mania, the Sensible Soccer series, and the Cannon Fodder series became classics all over Europe, especially in the UK where various Sensible games were number one for 52 weeks of the 3 year period between June 1992 – 1995. With the rise of the 16-bit home console market, Sensible's games were ported to a wide range of computing platforms, including MS-DOS, the Mega Drive, and Super NES.

32-bit era
Though Sensible had a strong presence on the 8-bit and 16-bit machines that dominated the late 1980s and early 1990s, this success was not repeated on the 32-bit machines such as the PlayStation prominent in the mid 1990s. The trademark look of cute 2D characters had slipped out of vogue with the advent of cheap 3D rendering abilities and games such as Actua Soccer and FIFA turned to 2.5D and 3D gradually shoving the Sensible Soccer series aside though belatedly converting the game to 3D in 1998.

Sensible Golf, a simple golf video game (not a simulation), did not perform well in the market and with most of Sensible's staffing resources having been thrown into Sex 'n' Drugs 'n' Rock 'n' Roll, a game that had initially been signed by Renegade Software (a Time Warner Interactive subsidiary) was dropped by their purchasers, GT Interactive (best known for Doom II, Duke Nukem 3D, Quake, and Unreal Tournament), the owners were looking for a smooth exit.

Though never finished, this final project was discussed in certain sections of the media outside of the game press.  It was featured in an Independent on Sunday article in mid-1997. Two years later in 1999, the pre-rendered music videos – created for the game with animation by Khalifa Saber – were showcased within a feature piece on Ex Machina, a TV show covering the CG animation scene on .tv.

Another cancelled game that was being developed during this final development period was a PlayStation action game titled Have a Nice Day, also known as Office Chair Massacre.  Though screenshots have never been released, it was a first-person shooter, inspired somewhat by the simplicity of Re-Loaded, a first generation PlayStation game by Gremlin Interactive. Jon Hare has spoken about the project in various interviews, but has never discussed the game's content and gameplay features in depth. Aside from the likelihood that it contained themes as controversial as Sex 'n' Drugs 'n' Rock 'n' Roll, in an interview with Total Video Games Derek dela Fuente, Jon mentioned that the game had "hit some technical barriers" during its development. Sensible was not known to have worked on the PlayStation platform before, which may have made learning the console's problematic 3D libraries a huge issue for the inexperienced team.

Sensible Software was eventually sold in 1999 to veteran UK games publishers Codemasters and since this date Jon Hare has maintained a close working relationship with Codemasters designing many of its games, including a variety of updates of both Sensible Soccer and Cannon Fodder.

Legacy
In 2006 the Sensible Software game Sensible World of Soccer was entered into a Games Canon of the 10 most important video games of all time by Stanford University, it was the only game developed in Europe to make the list which also included Spacewar!, Star Raiders, Zork, Tetris, SimCity, Super Mario Bros. 3, Civilization, Doom, and the Warcraft series.

In 2013, the book Sensible Software 1986–1999 was released. This comprehensive retrospective on the history of the company was written by Zzap!64 games journalist Gary Penn in conversational style. It features 19 different contributors including extensive interviews with Jon Hare, plus luminaries of the era including David Darling (entrepreneur), Dominik Diamond, and Peter Molyneux. Chris Yates declined to be interviewed for the book.  Half art book and half retrospective analysis, the book is the first of its kind to cover the creative, business, and technical issues that shaped the whole era of early games development in the UK and Sensible Software in particular. The historical importance of this book has been recognised by BAFTA which hold copies in both its library in Central London and its historical archive.

In 2020, the Royal Mail issued a series of postage stamps celebrating great British computer games with Sensible Soccer commemorated as a first class stamp.

Games

References

External links 
 Sensible Software at MobyGames
 Sensible Software interview with Jon Hare

1986 establishments in England
1999 disestablishments in England
Companies based in Chelmsford
Defunct companies of England
Defunct video game companies of the United Kingdom
Golden Joystick Award winners
 
Software companies of England
Video game companies established in 1986
Video game companies disestablished in 1999
1999 mergers and acquisitions